was an Edo period Japanese samurai, and the 12th daimyō  of Kaga Domain in the Hokuriku region of Japan. He was the 13th hereditary lord of the Kanazawa Maeda clan.

Biography
Nariyasu was born in Kanazawa in 1811, the 2nd son of the Kaga daimyō, Maeda Narinaga. His childhood name was Katsuchiyo (勝千代) later Katsumaru (勝丸) and become Inuchiyo (犬千代). His father retired in 1822, passing family headship to Nariyasu (who first took the adult name of Toshiyasu (利康)); however, Narinaga retained control of domain affairs until his death in 1824. Rather notably, Nariyasu later became the first Kaga daimyō since Toshitsune to hold the high level court title of chūnagon. After his father's death, Nariyasu took personal control of Kaga's government, and implemented a policy of domainal reform. He was initially supportive of a conservative policy; however, after Commodore Perry's arrival at Uraga he was an active supporter of liberal policies and military modernization in Kaga Domain.

Nariyasu was involved in much of the Kyoto-centered politics of the Bakumatsu period. He had entrusted a portion of the Kaga military to his son Maeda Yoshiyasu, who took part in the defense of the imperial palace during the Kinmon Incident of 1864. However, Yoshiyasu did not put up a committed fight, and in defeat, chose to flee Kyoto. Nariyasu, enraged, placed Yoshiyasu under solitary confinement, and ordered the seppuku of the two Kaga domain elders, Matsudaira Daini and Ōnoki Nakasaburō. Working with the castle warden Honda Masahito, he also confined the activities of the pro-sonnō jōi samurai in the Kanazawa. 

Nariyasu officially retired in 1866, and was succeeded by his son Yoshiyasu; however, he retained personal control of the domain, very cautiously edging toward closer relations with Satsuma and Chōshū. Under Nariyasu's leadership, Kaga sided with the imperial side during the Boshin War, and took part in the imperial army's military action in the Echigo Campaign.

Nariyasu died in 1884, at age 72; he is buried in Ishikawa Prefecture.

Family
Father: Maeda Narinaga 
Mother: Oyae no Kata later Eiyou’in
Wife: Tokugawa Yōhime (1813–1868), daughter of 11th shōgun Tokugawa Ienari
Concubines:
 Okisa no Kata
 Omie no Kata later Shunsen’in
 Otsu no Kata later Meikyoin
 Ochisa no Kata
 Oiku no Kata
Children:
 Son 1: Maeda Yoshiyasu (1830-1874) by Yōhime
 Son 2: Senjiro (1832-1834) by Yōhime
 Son 3: Maeda Toshinori (1833 – 1855) by Okisa no Kata
 Son 4: Ikeda Yoshitaka (1834-1850) by Yo-hime
Son 5: Maeda Toshimichi (1835 – 1855) by Okisa no Kata
 Son 6: Junrokuro (1836-1838) by Omie no Kata
Daughter 1: Manhime (1839-1839) by Okisa no Kata
 Son 7: Maeda Toshika (1841 – 1920) by Otsu no Kata
 Maeda Naoyori (1847-1856) by Otsu no Kata
 Ryomaro (1848-1851) by Ochisa no Kata 
 Kannosuke (1849-1849) by Oiku no Kata
 Maeda Toshiatsu (1856 – 1921) by Oiku no Kata
 Hatsuko (1860-1929) by Oiku no Kata
 Daughter: Hiroko (1863-1925) married Nijō Motohiro by Oiku no Kata
 Maeda Toshitake (1865-1890) by Oiku no Kata
 Daughter: Ikuko (1867-1943) married Asano Nagamichi later married Okabe Nagamoto by Oiku no Kata

Notes

References
 Kanazawa domain genealogy (retrieved 10 September 2007)
 "Visiting the graves of the Maeda house" (retrieved 10 September 2007)
 Maeda Nariyasu on Nekhet's "World Nobility" site (retrieved 10 September 2007)

Published work
(published posthumously)
Sarugaku menhai ron 申樂免廢論. Tokyo: Ishiguro Bunkichi 石黒文吉, 1934.

Further reading
Papinot, Edmond. (1948). Historical and Geographical Dictionary of Japan. New York: Overbeck Co.
Ishikawa kenritsu rekishi hakubutsukan 石川県立歴史博物館 (1995). Kaga hanshu Maeda Nariyasu 加賀藩主前田斉泰. Kanazawa: Ishikawa Kenritsu Rekishi Hakubutsukan.

1811 births
1884 deaths
Meiji Restoration
People of Edo-period Japan
Maeda clan
Tozama daimyo
People from Kanazawa, Ishikawa